The Beautiful Dreamer (Spanish: El bello durmiente) is a 1952 Mexican comedy film directed by Gilberto Martínez Solares and starring Germán Valdés, Lilia del Valle and Wolf Ruvinskis.

The film's sets were designed by the art director Edward Fitzgerald.

Cast
 Germán Valdés  as Triquitrán  
 Lilia del Valle as Jade / Yolanda 
 Wolf Ruvinskis  as Tracatá / Dr. Heinrich Wolf  
 Marcelo Chávez  as Tico Tico / Don Marcelo  
 Juan García  as Cavernario bruto  
 Gloria Mestre as Invitada a fiesta 
 José René Ruiz  as Brujo Chaquira  
 Pascual García Peña  
 Nicolás Rodríguez as Don Ramón  
 Armando Arriola as Don Alfonso  
 Lucrecia Muñoz as Cavernaria / excursionista  
 Manuel Trejo Morales as Cavernario  
 Elena Julián  as Cavernaria  
 Georgina González as Cavernaria  
 Elvira Lodi as Cavernaria en salón de belleza  
 Eduardo Bonada  
 Joaquín García Vargas as Brujo  
 Tonina Jackson 
 Fernando Osés 
 Guillermo Hernández
 Sergio Llanes 
 Jack Parelli 
 Raul Romero 
 Fuco Jiménez  
 Joe Silva
 Rodolfo Calvo as Juez de registro civil  
 Jorge Chesterking as Invitado fiesta disfraz  
 Fernando Curiel as Reportero  
 Leonor Gómez as Cavernaria  
 Diana Ochoa as Excursionista  
 Ángela Rodríguez as Invitada a boda  
 Pepe Ruiz Vélez as Locutor  
 María Valdealde as Invitada a fiesta de disfraz  
 Ramón Valdés as Cavernario

References

Bibliography 
 Paul A. Schroeder Rodríguez. Latin American Cinema: A Comparative History. Univ of California Press, 2016.

External links 
 

1952 films
1952 comedy films
Mexican comedy films
1950s Spanish-language films
Films directed by Gilberto Martínez Solares
Films about dinosaurs
Films scored by Manuel Esperón
Mexican black-and-white films
1950s Mexican films